"Innocence" is the lead single by Finnish singer Tarja, taken from her fourth studio album The Shadow Self. The single was released on August 5, 2016.

Background
"Innocence" was written and composed by Tarja, Anders Wollbeck, and Mattias Lindblom, and produced by Tarja. The singer describes "Innocence" as a return to the origins from the musical point of view. The song, especially the solo piano by Tarja, is inspired by classical music.

Video
The official video for the song was released on June 24, 2016.
Tarja explained that "The theme of the video is about a very sensitive subject that hopefully helps people to think over it. I love the film approach to the video like a short movie". The video was shot in Buenos Aires by movie director Mariano Cattaneo. In the video there are scenes performed by actors, representing a family destroyed by domestic violence. At the end of the video, Tarja breaks into the room and paralyzes the family's father with a touch, saving the mother and the child.

Track listing

References

External links

Tarja Turunen songs
2016 songs
2016 singles
Songs written by Anders Wollbeck
Songs written by Mattias Lindblom
Songs written by Tarja Turunen